Tactusa major is a moth of the family Erebidae first described by Michael Fibiger in 2010. It is known from northern Thailand.

The wingspan is about 11 mm. The forewing is dominated by a blackish oblique band. There is a yellow patch proximal to the apex. There is only a terminal line, indicated by small, black interneural spots. The hindwing is dark grey, with an indistinct discal spot. The underside is unicolorous grey.

References

Micronoctuini
Taxa named by Michael Fibiger
Moths described in 2010